FC Tempo Prague is a football club located in Prague-Lhotka, Czech Republic. It currently plays in the sixth level of the Czech football system having been relegated from the Prague Championship in 2015. The club took part in the 2013–14 Czech Cup and won their game in the preliminary round to qualify for the first round proper of the competition.

References

External links
  
 FC Tempo Prague at the website of the Prague Football Association 

Football clubs in the Czech Republic
Football clubs in Prague
Association football clubs established in 1928